Tekle Haymanot Tessemma, also known as Adal Tessemma, Tekle Haymanot of Gojjam, and Tekle Haimanot of Gojjam (1847 – 10 January 1901), was King of Gojjam. He later was an army commander and a member of the nobility of the Ethiopian Empire.

Biography 
Born Adal Tessemma, Tekle Haymanot Tessemma was the son of Tessemma Goshu, Negus of Gojjam. Gojjam had long been a vassal kingdom within the Ethiopian Empire. The title "King of Gojjam" was an honorific title.

Under Tekle Giyorgis
Dejazmach Tessemma Goshu died during his son's minority.  As a result, a rival, and Gojam prince, of the Gojam imperial house, named Ras Desta Tadla assumed control in Gojjam and imprisoned Adal.  Adal eventually escaped to the lowlands and raised an army.  After returning to Gojjam and defeating Ras Desta, Adal submitted to Nəgusä Nägäst Tekle Giyorgis who confirmed him as the Shum of Gojjam and as Dejazmach.  The Nəgusä Nägäst even allowed Adal to marry his paternal sister, Laqetch Gebre Mehdin.

Under Yohannes IV
On 11 July 1871, Dejazmach Kassay Mercha defeated Nəgusä Nägäst Tekle Giyorgis and reinstated Ras Desta in Gojjam.  On 21 January 1872, Kassay Mercha became Nəgusä Nägäst Yohannes IV and left Gojjam.  Adal then returned to Gojjam and killed Desta. At that point, Adal had consolidated all of Gojjam under his rule.  In 1874, Adal submitted to Nəgusä Nägäst Yohannes IV.  Adal was now Ras Tekle Haymanot Tessemma. 

On 20 January 1881, in Debre Tabor, Nəgusä Nägäst Yohannes IV appointed Ras Tekle Haymanot Tessemma as Negus of Gojjam Province and as Negus of Kaffa Province. However, the latter province was only his if he was able to conquer it.  Unfortunately for Ras Tekle Haymanot Tessemma, Ras Menelik, Negus of Shewa, was also interested in Kaffa Province.  Yohannes provided Tekle Haymanot with 8,000 rifles to help with the conquest.

The Battle of Embabo

The followers of Negus Tekle Haymanot Tessemma attempted to extend his control over the Kingdom of Kaffa.  But, on 6 June 1882, his forces were defeated at the Battle of Embabo by the superior forces of Negus Menelik. Tekle Haymanot Tessemma was captured and Menelik gained the upper hand in Kaffa.  But Yohannes intervened and, while allowing Menelik to have Kaffa, he made Menelik give Wollo Province to Ras Araya Selassie Yohannes, his legitimate son.

Destruction and submission

in January 1887 Negus Tekle Haymanot attacked the Mahdists at Metema and sacks the town. In response the Next year the Mahdists under Abu Anga campaigned out of Metemma into Ethiopia; their objective was the Historical town of Gondar. Tekle Haymanot confronted him at Sar Weha on 18 January 1888, but was defeated. As a result of this loss, northwestern Ethiopia was open to the Mahdists who followed up their victory by entering, sacking, and burning Gondar. many of its inhabitants were captured and enslaved.

Emperor Yohannes IV ordered Negus Menelik and his Shewan army into Gojjam and Begemder.  Sensing a shift in power, Negus Tekle Haymanot Tessemma negotiated a defensive alliance with Menelik.  After Menelik secured Gojjam and Begemder, Yohannes ordered him to return to Shewa.

In September 1888, when Tekle Haymanot Tessemma refused to contribute forces to the efforts of Yohannes against Mahdist who had re-entered western Gojjam, Yohannes suspected Tekle Haymanot and Menelik of plotting against him.  To destroy the power of Tekle Haymanot, the army of Yohannes laid waste to much of Gojjam.  As a result of the destruction, Tekle Haymanot submitted to Yohannes.

Under Menelik II
In 1889, soon after the death of Yohannes at the Battle of Gallabat, Menelik proclaimed himself Nəgusä Nägäst Menelik II.  Negus Tekle Haymanot pledged his allegiance to the new Nəgusä Nägäst.  Menelik reinstated Tekle Haymanot as Shum of Gojjam and named him as an advisor.

Battle of Adwa

In 1896, Negus Tekle Haymanot fought at the Battle of Adwa on the side of Menelik. During the battle of Adwa he commanded 8,000 riflemen, 15,000 spearmen and 700 calvary.

Death

Ultimately Emperor Menelik determined that Gojjam was too valuable a province to be held by one man and, upon the death of Tekle Haymanot, Menelik divided Gojjam into three parts.  He assigned the three parts to different men responsible to him.  One of the men came from Shewa.

Tekle Haymanot Tessemma was the father of at least three sons and four daughters.  His sons were as follows: Bezabah, Hailu, and Balaw.  One of his sons, Ras Hailu Tekle Haymanot, succeeded him as Hailu II of Gojjam.

See also
 Ethiopian aristocratic and court titles
 List of field marshals

Notes 
Footnotes

Citations

References

Further reading 
 Bairu Tafla, "Two of the Last Provincial Kings of Ethiopia", Journal of Ethiopian Studies, 11 (1973), pp. 29-55

1847 births
1901 deaths
Ethiopian military personnel
Ethiopian nobility
19th-century Ethiopian people